Whitstable railway station is on the  branch of the Chatham Main Line in England, serving the town of Whitstable, Kent.

The station and all trains that call are operated by Southeastern.

History
Whitstable has been served by five different stations on two different routes. The first station on that line to serve Whitstable was in Oxford Street, and had latterly been known as Whitstable Town; it closed after the last train on 31 December 1914.

The following day, a new station was opened  to the east; this was named Whitstable Town & Tankerton. This was renamed Whitstable & Tankerton on 1 February 1936, and Whitstable in 1979.

Facilities
The station has a ticket office which is staffed throughout the day Monday-Saturday and during Sunday mornings and early afternoons. The station also has a self-service ticket machine for ticket purchases for when the ticket office is closed.

The station has passenger help points located on both platforms as well as toilets and a waiting room which are open when the station is staffed. There is a chargeable car park (operated by Saba Parking) as well as cycle racks located at the entrance to the station. There is also a taxi rank at the station.

The station has step-free access available to both platforms from the street although the platforms are linked via a stepped footbridge meaning step-free access is not possible between the platforms.

Bus connections
The station is served by the Stagecoach South East routes 4 and 5 which provide connections to Whitstable town centre, Chestfield and Canterbury.

The Stagecoach operated Triangle service between Canterbury and Herne Bay can be caught from the town centre, which is a short walk from the railway station.

Services
All services at Whitstable are operated by Southeastern  using  and  EMUs.

The typical off-peak service in trains per hour is:

 1 tph to London St Pancras International
 1 tph to  
 2 tph to 

See also
Whitstable Harbour railway station

References

External links

Whitstable
Railway stations in Kent
DfT Category D stations
Former London, Chatham and Dover Railway stations
Railway stations in Great Britain opened in 1860
Railway stations in Great Britain closed in 1915
Railway stations in Great Britain opened in 1915
Railway stations served by Southeastern